Sheffield is a community in Sunbury County in the Canadian province of New Brunswick. It lies within the St. John River valley and is served by New Brunswick Route 105 (former Trans-Canada Highway) and New Brunswick Route 695.

History

Notable people

The founder of Burpee Seeds, W. Atlee Burpee was from Sheffield.

See also
List of communities in New Brunswick

References

Communities in Sunbury County, New Brunswick